Devathaiyai Kanden is a 2005 Indian Tamil-language romantic drama film written and directed by Boopathy Pandian. The film stars Dhanush and Sridevi Vijaykumar. The film borrows its name from a hit song from another Dhanush film, Kaadhal Kondein (2003). The film was released on 14 January 2005 and went on to become a commercial success. The film was remade in Kannada as Jaaji Mallige.

Plot 
Babu is a struggling tea-vendor who makes a living out of selling milk tea, carrying the business on his bicycle. He falls in love with Uma, a rich college girl. Gradually, Uma also reciprocates Babu's feelings for his good nature and things go smoothly for a while.

Uma's parents find her a wealthy groom who is well-educated. Uma is in a dilemma on whom to choose as her life partner. She thinks of her future if she chooses the impoverished Babu where she visualizes herself giving birth to a child in a government hospital, her husband unable to raise required money for her medical expenses and overall a very difficult life; in contrast to a life where she is pampered by everyone, her every need taken care of almost instantly if she chooses to marry the groom selected by her parents.

While Babu is on a religious trip to Sabarimala, Uma decides to marry the groom Bala so that she can continue to lead a comfortable life. Babu is devastated when he learns of this and heartbroken when Uma goes to the extent of shouting at him. He accuses her parents for changing her mind.

Babu gets arrested after trying to attempt suicide during a Valentine's Day gathering. He is taken to the police station and gets beaten up by an inspector. Babu's friend Kaduppu Subramani pleads with the inspector saying that Babu and him are orphans and there is no one to ask after them if they get killed. This changes the inspector's mind and makes him look at Babu's plight kindly and he agrees to file a case against Uma.

In a unique way, Babu files a case against Uma for not holding the promise made to him of sharing a life together for a good 50 years. The case soon gathers momentum and has the public discussing it everywhere. As the case progresses, several sacrifices made by Babu for the sake of Uma come into light through revelations made by people known to him and by his close friends. Uma has a change of heart and on the final day of the hearing, decides to reunite with Babu.

When Uma offers a rose to Babu, he refuses to accept her, saying that the case was filed not to win her back, but to teach a lesson to her and every girl with an attitude identical. He justifies further by saying that yesterday she hated him because of his status but today she loves him and tomorrow she may again find him unattractive. Babu also says that as he did not know English, she left him. While leaving the court complex, much to the surprise of the visibly embarrassed Uma, he tells his last word to her in his known English, "Goodbye".

Cast

Production 
Dhanush signed the film, then titled Ennai Mattum Kadhal Pannu, soon after the success of Thulluvadho Ilamai and the venture was initially set to star Sherin, who appeared alongside him in that film. Since then, the title and the heroine went through a couple of changes, briefly being referred to as Kadhal Sughamanathu, Kadhalna Summava, and then finally as Devathaiyai Kanden, after the popular song of Dhanush-starrer Kadhal Kondein. Sridevi Vijayakumar replaced Sherin as heroine in the film.

The film was delayed as Dhanush had signed on to appear in several other films following the success of Kaadhal Kondein (2003). Other projects he prioritised over Devathaiyai Kanden included Pudhukottaiyilirundhu Saravanan (2004), Sullan (2004), Dreams (2004) and Adhu Oru Kana Kaalam (2005). He also worked on a number of dropped films during the period including K. S. Ravikumar's Odipolaama, Selvaraghavan's Doctors, Sibi Chakravarthy's Raghava and Manmadha Rasa.

Soundtrack 
The soundtrack was composed by Deva.

Release and reception
Devathaiyai Kanden was released on 14 January 2005 on the eve of Pongal with other releases like Ayya, Iyer IPS, Aayudham and Thirupaachi.

Malini Mannath of Chennai Online wrote "It is Bhoopathypandian's first directorial venture and he can be appreciated for trying out something out of the routine here. If only he had polished up the earlier scenes too!". Visual Dasan of Kalki praised the direction and appreciated the performances of Dhanush and Sridevi.

References

External links

2005 films
2005 romantic drama films
Films scored by Deva (composer)
2000s Tamil-language films
Indian romantic drama films
Tamil films remade in other languages
2005 directorial debut films
Films directed by Boopathy Pandian